Muraste is a village in Harku Parish, Harju County in northern Estonia. It has a population of 1860 (as of 1 December 2019).
		 
Writer Erni Krusten (1900–1984) was born in Muraste.

Muraste Manor

References

Villages in Harju County
Kreis Harrien